Desmond Patrick Backos (born 13 November 1950) is a South African former footballer who played in the Football League for Stoke City.

Career
Backos was born in Johannesburg and played football with local sides Johannesburg Rangers, Highlands Park a second spell at Johannesburg Rangers and Hellenic. At Hellenic he worked under former England international George Eastham who working as a coach but in 1977 Eastham returned to England and Backos moved to the United States to play for the Los Angeles Aztecs. But Backos was brought over to England by Eastham in November 1977 who was now manager at Stoke City. However Backos had an awful time at Stoke managing to make just two appearances and soon returned to South Africa in January 1978.

Career statistics

References

South African soccer players
South African expatriate soccer players
White South African people
South African people of Greek descent
Stoke City F.C. players
English Football League players
1950 births
Living people
Highlands Park F.C. players
Hellenic F.C. players
Los Angeles Aztecs players
Rangers F.C. (South Africa) players
Soccer players from Johannesburg
North American Soccer League (1968–1984) players
Expatriate soccer players in the United States
Expatriate footballers in England
South African expatriate sportspeople in the United States
South African expatriate sportspeople in England
Association football forwards